Hrvatska traži zvijezdu season 3 (Croatian for "Croatia is searching for a Star") is the third season of the second Croatian version of Pop Idol. It is currently on air.

Auditions were held in the four biggest cities of the country: Zagreb, Rijeka, Osijek and Split. Tony Cetinski and Goran Lisica returned as judges while Anđa Marić was replaced by Ivana Mišerić, a radio DJ.

Top 15 - Current hits
Original Airdate: April 22, 2011

Top 10 - Croatian 90's hits
Original Airdate: April 29, 2011

Top 9 - Famous singers
Original Airdate: May 6, 2011

2011 Croatian television seasons